Masuma Rahman Nabila is a Bangladeshi television presenter, model and actress. She started her career in 2006 as a TV host.

Early life 
Nabila was born in Jeddah, Saudi Arabia. Her father Lutfar Rahman was appointed as an auditing officer in a private firm. She studied at Bangladesh International School & College in Jeddah. Nabila moved to Dhaka after completing her Secondary School Certificate (SSC). She finished her Higher Secondary School Certificate (HSC) at Viqarunnisa Noon School and College, and completed her B.A (Honours) in English from BRAC University.

Modeling 
Nabila made her modeling debut by doing a short appearance on a TVC in 2006 for sharp blade directed by Mostofa Sarwar Farooki. She has also done some photo shoots for magazine and newspapers.

Television career 
Nabila stepped into the media world with a school magazine show on Banglavision called Ebong Class Er Baire in 2006. Soon after she hosted a live quiz show called Janar ache bolar ache on NTV, Vocab on Banglavision and a live music request show Music Together on Banglavision. She has hosted some big events like BPL opening ceremony and the 100-day countdown to the ICC World Twenty20. Apart from TV show hosting, Nabila had participated in TV commercials for Robi, Fair & Lovely, Banglalink and Dabur Vatika Enriched Coconut Hair Oil etc. She is also a brand ambassador for Parachute Advanced Hair Oil.

Television

TV fiction

Filmography 
Nabila made her debut in the movie Aynabaji in 2016. The movie was a blockbuster and she has won many awards for her role in the film.

Film

Web works

Radio show

Music video

Advertisements

Awards and nominations

References 

Living people
VJs (media personalities)
Bangladeshi television personalities
Bangladeshi female models
People from Chittagong
Year of birth missing (living people)
Bangladeshi actresses
Best Film Actress Meril-Prothom Alo Award winners
Best Actress Bachsas Award winners